Soraya Nini is the author of Ils disent que je suis une beurette (1993). The novel was adapted into a film, Samia, directed by Philippe Faucon in 2000.

Bibliography
 Nini, Soraya. Ils disent que je suis une beurette. Paris: Fixot, 1993.

Sources
 IMDB profile, https://www.imdb.com/name/nm0632453/
 McIlvanney, Siobhan. “The articulation of beur female identity in the works of Farida Belghoul, Ferrudja Kessas and Soraya Nini.” In Women’s Writing in Contemporary France: New Writers, New Literatures in the 1990s. Manchester: Manchester University Press, 2002. 130-141.
 “Female Identity in Process in Soraya Nini’s Ils disent que je suis une beurette.” Modern and Contemporary France 6 (1998): 505-17.
 “Radicalising Convention: Feminist Readings of Literature and Language in Soraya Nini’s Ils disent que je suis une beurette.” In Gender and Identities in France 4 (1999): 63-71.

French women writers
French people of Algerian descent
Living people
Year of birth missing (living people)